Asegaon may refer to:

 Asegaon, Yavatmal, a village in Yavalmal district of Maharashtra state of India
 Asegaon, Jintur, a village in Parbhani district of Maharashtra state of India